"Jump" is a song by American singer Julia Michaels featuring fellow American singer and rapper Trippie Redd. The song was released on May 4, 2018.

Music video
The music video was released on June 7, 2018.

Charts

Weekly charts

Year-end charts

Certifications

References

2018 singles
2018 songs
Julia Michaels songs
Songs written by Justin Tranter
Songs written by Julia Michaels
Songs written by Nick Monson
Songs written by Trippie Redd
Trippie Redd songs